Tivoli Two is a live album by pianist Duke Jordan's Trio recorded at the Tivolis Koncertsal and first released on the Danish SteepleChase label in 1984.

Reception

AllMusic reviewer Scott Yanow stated "Jordan is heard at the top of his game during these swinging and probing performances".

Track listing
All compositions by Duke Jordan except as indicated
 "No Problem" - 10:44
 "How Deep Is the Ocean?" (Irving Berlin) - 6:37
 "All the Things You Are" (Oscar Hammerstein II, Jerome Kern) - 6:51
 "Jealous Blues" - 6:22
 "I Cover the Waterfront" (Johnny Green, Edward Heyman) - 5:25
 "A Night in Tunisia" (Dizzy Gillespie, Frank Paparelli) - 13:10
 "Jordu" - 1:55

Personnel
Duke Jordan - piano
Wilbur Little - bass 
Dannie Richmond - drums

References

1984 live albums
Duke Jordan live albums
SteepleChase Records live albums